The qualifying for the 2018 Men's World Floorball Championships took place between 22 January and 11 February 2018. A total of 33 teams competed for sixteen spots. The final tournament was organized by Czech Republic in December 2018.

Overview
Numbers in brackets show the ranking before the qualification started, which is based on results from the last two World Championships.

Notes
Teams marked in bold have qualified for the final tournament.

Europe
The qualification rules are as follows:
 The two best teams from each qualification group will qualify
 The two best third placed teams will qualify
 The calculation of the best 3rd teams will follow this order:
 1. Average number of points 
 2. Average goal difference 
 3. Average scored goals
 4. Drawing of lots

Europe 1

Europe 2

Europe 3

Europe 4

Best four runner-ups
Only the two best runner-ups of the four will advance. Since the number of teams between the qualification groups differs, the group sizes will be equalized by removing the results from the matches against the lowest placed teams in the larger-sized group before comparing the average results.

Asia/Oceania

Asia/Oceania 1

Asia/Oceania 2

Second round

7th place game

Semifinals

5th place game

3rd place game

Final

Final ranking

Americas

References

2018, Men's Qualifying
2018 in floorball